Assai may mean:

Assai in musical terminology, meaning "very"
Euterpe, a genus of palms commonly called Açaí or Assai Palm
Assaí, a municipality located in Paraná state, Brazil
Assai (company), a Dutch multinational software company based in Culemborg, The Netherlands